The 2010s was the fifth decade in the industry's history. The decade was notable for producing the first truly "3D" games and consoles, introducing cloud gaming and virtual reality to consumers, and the rising influence of tablet-based and mobile casual games, including a boom in freemium titles. The industry remained heavily dominated by the actions of Nintendo, Sony, and Microsoft. The eighth generation of video game consoles was released, including the Wii U, PlayStation 4, Xbox One and Nintendo 3DS. Notable games released in the decade included Minecraft, Fortnite, Grand Theft Auto V, The Elder Scrolls V: Skyrim, The Legend of Zelda: Breath of the Wild, Red Dead Redemption and its sequel, Dark Souls and God of War.

Consoles of the 2010s

Seventh generation consoles (2005-2012)

The seventh generation of video game consoles entered the market in the mid-2000s with the release of the Xbox 360, PlayStation 3, and Wii. These three consoles dominated the video game scene throughout much of the early-2010s as well. Each console brought with them a new breakthrough in technology. The Xbox 360 offered games rendered natively at HD resolutions. In addition to HD games, Sony's PlayStation 3 featured a built in Blu-ray player. Nintendo, having opted out of the HD race, focused more on mobility and interaction. All three major consoles expanded their overall use by doubling as media centers, featuring Wi-Fi internet connectivity, and allowing the use of apps.

Regarding the handheld market, Nintendo's evolving DS series of handhelds and Sony's PlayStation Portable dominated the market throughout much of the late-2000s. The Nintendo DS introduced a dual screen, as well as touchscreen gaming. The PSP was Sony's first attempt at competing in the handheld market and featured multiple ports to other devices, improved graphics, and is known for being the first handheld video game device to use an optical disc format.

Eighth generation consoles (2012–present)

The seventh generation of video game consoles followed a longer than usual console cycle. Nintendo was the first of the big three companies to announce their next generation console, doing so at E3 2011 with the unveiling of the Wii U, the successor to the Wii. The Wii U was released in North America, Europe, Australia and New Zealand in November 2012 and in Japan the following month. Reception to the console was mixed, with many reviewers criticising the limited choice of launch games available.

Both Microsoft and Sony announced their offerings in the eighth generation in 2013. On May 21, just weeks before E3 2013, Microsoft revealed its "all-in-one entertainment device," the Xbox One. Reaction among the press and gamers was mixed, with many gamers criticizing DRM-related restrictions and persistent internet requirements. E3 in June saw Microsoft reveal a November launch date for the Xbox One and Sony unveil its eighth generation console, the PlayStation 4. The PlayStation 4 received an enthusiastic response from the attendees after it was revealed it would lack DRM restrictions and online requirements and have a cheaper launch price than the Xbox One, leading some commentators to declare Sony the winner of E3. In the week following E3, Microsoft announced a reversal of its online and used games restrictions after substantial negative feedback.

The eight generation was further elongated with the release of the PS4 Pro and the Xbox One X, both more-powerful variations of their predecessors capable of displaying video games in 4K resolution, as well as the Nintendo Switch, a hybrid portable-home video game console meant to replace the Wii U. The Wii U was discontinued following the release of the Switch in March 2017.

Handheld gaming in the eighth generation was dominated primarily by the Nintendo 3DS and the PlayStation Vita. The Nintendo 3DS is the first video game device to feature 3D gaming without the need for stereoscopic glasses. Sony's Vita is the successor to the PSP. Both systems are backward compatible. Nvidia also announced its intention to market a handheld video game device.

The eighth generation consoles were expected to face stiff competition from tablet and smartphone video game markets, online services and dedicated consoles based on cheap technology and free-to-play games or low cost downloadable content away from big budget blockbusters, as well as an increased interest in independent games promoted by popular social networking sites.

History

Impact of the Great Recession on the video game industry 

The financial crisis that struck in the late-2000s affected the video game industry. Many electronic gadgets, not just video games, were perceived to be a luxury item. Also, market shifts towards mobile and casual gaming led to a dip in overall sales as well.

New Dimensions 
Following the release of James Cameron's long-awaited film, Avatar in 2009, utilizing stereoscopic 3D technology became a staple in the early 2010s in the production and services of television, as well as video games. Nintendo released the first video game device to feature stereoscopic 3D visuals without the need for special glasses with the 3DS handheld.

In a related trend, Sony unveiled "dual-view" at E3 2011. Dual view technology provides the capability of playing multiplayer games on the same screen without splitting it by overlaying the two images on top of each other.

Cloud-based and subscription gaming 
Cloud gaming, or sometimes known as gaming on demand, is a technology in which the actual game and saved data is stored on a company's server, and users play the game over a stable internet connection. One major advantage to cloud gaming is the absence of a compact disc or cartridge required for use. In 2010, the OnLive gaming console debuted becoming the first console to exclusively feature cloud-based gaming. As the decade progressed, even some of the major players began to look into utilizing cloud gaming on their systems. In early 2012, it was the fastest-growing segment of the video game market.

In 2013, Julie Uhrman began a Kickstarter campaign to raise funding for her cloud-based video game console, the Ouya. The Ouya outdid their goal by raising over US$8.5 million, becoming that site's second-highest-earning project at the time. It operates with technology from Android, and features customization to the device's cover.

During a press conference at the 2014 Consumer Electronics Show, Sony unveiled PlayStation Now, a subscription-based streaming service that allows the PlayStation 4 to play previous console titles over the internet. As of February 2014, Now was in closed beta, but was planned to be released to the public later in the year. Sony had recommended users to have at least a 5 Mbit/s internet connection speed for what they termed "good performance."

Cloud gaming is expected, by many video game experts, to challenge the dominance of the major video game corporations, and may eventually lead to the decline of console gaming entirely.

Tablet-based, smartphone, and social networking gaming 
As transformative as the iPad was to the tablet PC industry, it also had a lasting effect on the video game world as well. Apple's high-resolution displays and mobile graphics processors set a high bar on graphical capabilities that rivaled some of the major handheld video game devices. As of 2014, nearly half of the Top-25 paid applications on the iPad App Store were games. Despite not having a controller, mobile devices and games continued to become a staple of the "casual gaming" market.

Mobility 

Ever since Nintendo released the original Wii in 2006, mobility and interaction became a major focus to the video game world. It encouraged activity with gaming beyond the traditional controller, and expanded the market to include the elderly and those interested in physical therapy. Microsoft and Sony did not respond to Nintendo's motion sensor technology until 2010 when they released Kinect and PlayStation Move, respectively. The Kinect took further advantage of motion control by not requiring a controller at all.

In September 2012, Yosh Engineering unveiled a new immersive motion capture, virtual reality program. The YEI 3-Space Sensor product line featured allows for highly accurate body and head tracking giving the wearer full freedom of mobility in a realistic virtual environment. Yosh Engineering showed that the technology was both adaptable to contemporary graphic requirements and that the wearer has a freedom to move about through 3D space.

In 2013, a Houston-based upstart named Virtuix began a Kickstarter campaign to develop the Omni, an omnidirectional treadmill that has potential applications for video games. Such a device, if ever released to the public, would allow a player to walk naturally in the virtual environment of a game.

Growing Popularity of Let's Play videos 
The decade also saw the growing popularity of Let's Play videos on YouTube and Twitch, where viewers could watch streamers play through games. The YouTube channels of notable streamers such as PewDiePie, who became the first person to reach 10 billion views in 2015, were among the most-subscribed of the decade.

Violence debate is revived 
In the aftermath of several mass shootings, namely the Aurora, Colorado theater shooting and the Sandy Hook Elementary School shooting, debate on whether or not there is a connection between violent video games and real-life violent acts re-emerged. Former United States President Barack Obama assigned his former Vice President, Joe Biden, to head a discussion with representatives for the gun and video game lobbies in early-2013. Several days later, Obama announced stricter legislation on guns and also proposed a $10 million study, to be headed by the CDC, on whether or not violent video games were encouraging violent behavior.

Sexism, racism and inclusion

Issues of sexism, racism and inclusion in video games came to the fore, as the demographic of gamers and public image of gaming shifted away from the traditional view of a largely male, heterosexual, young and white/Asian audience. The Gamergate harassment campaign was a response to criticism of sexism in gaming by Anita Sarkeesian and others.

Demographics 
According to the Entertainment Software Association, the average age of a person who played video games in 2010 was 30.

Notable video games of the decade

Notable franchises established in the 2010s 

Notes:
 Game franchises that also accompany major film or television franchises.
 Game franchises that are considered spin-offs of previously established franchises.

Highest-grossing games 

The following table lists the top ten highest-grossing video games of the decade, in terms of worldwide revenue (including buy-to-play, free-to-play, pay-to-play, digital purchases, microtransactions and subscriptions) across all platforms (including mobile, PC and console platforms). Among the top ten highest-grossing games of the decade, eight of them are free-to-play titles, five of which are published or owned by Chinese conglomerate Tencent.

Best-selling games 
The following table lists video games of the 2010s that have sold at least 10 million copies. The list only includes buy-to-play titles, and does not include free-to-play or subscription titles. The company that published the most number of games with over 10million sales during the decade was Nintendo, with fifteen titles on the list.

Most-played games

Most acclaimed games 
The following table lists the top ten video games of the decade based on their rankings on various publications' lists of the best video games of the decade. This list was determined by Metacritic, which used a points system based on how frequently certain games appeared on these lists and their rankings within the lists.

The following table lists the top ten video games of decade based on Metacritic's aggregate review scores.

Most influential games
The following is a partial list of games considered to be the most influential of the 2010s.

 Amnesia: The Dark Descent (Frictional Games, 2010) - A revisioning of the survival horror genre which stripped away the ability to fight back against the threatening creatures, it helped not only to re-popularize the genre, but it helped popularize Let's Play videos on YouTube and launched the careers of YouTube streamers such as PewDiePie reacting to the jump scares in the game.
 Nier (Cavia, 2010) - Considered one of the most influential Japanese role-playing games of the decade.
 Dark Souls (FromSoftware, 2011) - Established the idea of intentionally-difficult games that required the player to carefully learn and improve their character through repeated failed attempts, and inspired the Soulslike genre.
 Minecraft (Mojang, 2011) - A highly successful sandbox game that allowed players to be as creative as they wanted to be, which helped to further entertainment options like machinima. Minecraft also demonstrated the successful approach to early access releases.
 The Elder Scrolls V: Skyrim (Bethesda Game Studios, 2011) - Considered the best example of a Western computer role-playing game.
 Puzzle & Dragons (GungHo Online Entertainment, 2012) - A gacha game that established the dominant "freemium" microtransaction model used by mobile games, as well as the loot box model used by both mobile and big-budget games.
 Candy Crush Saga (King, 2012) - One of the first mobile games to successfully implement a "freemium" microtransaction model, establishing this model throughout the mobile game industry. Candy Crush Saga also helped turn a significant number of people into gamers.
 The Walking Dead: Season One (Telltale Games, 2012) - Revitalized the point-and-click adventure game genre which had gone by the wayside since the 1990s, as well as establishing the episodic release approach to narrative games.
 BioShock Infinite (Irrational Games, 2013) - An ambitious first-person shooter set in an alternate reality of the early 20th century. The game provided not only significant themes regarding politics and religion, but also touches on meta-commentary on the nature of choice within video games.
 Destiny (Bungie, 2014) - One of the first successful implementations of a games as a service model which provided frequent new content and updates over time.
 P.T. (Kojima Productions, 2014) - Considered to be possibly the most important horror game of the decade.
 The Witcher 3: Wild Hunt (CD Projekt, 2015) - While an open-world role-playing game designed after Skyrim, The Witcher 3 demonstrated a means to tightly integrate a story-driven narrative within an open-world game.
 Pokémon Go (Niantic, 2016) - Demonstrated a successful means of augmented reality games, and the potential for games that could be played in spurts of a few minutes that fit into most players' lifestyles.
 The Legend of Zelda: Breath of the Wild (Nintendo, 2017) - Breath of the Wild provided an atypical Legend of Zelda experience with an open-world driven game, but still holding to the core concepts of the franchise. It was a throwback to the open-world approach of the original Zelda; rather than telling players how to complete quests, it left it to players to figure it out for themselves and craft their own experience. It is considered the killer app that helped drive Nintendo Switch sales.
 PlayerUnknown's Battlegrounds (Bluehole, 2017) - PUBG was largely responsible for establishing and popularizing the battle royale game genre, inspired by the Japanese film Battle Royale and in turn inspiring numerous battle royale games (such as Fortnite). PUBG remains the most-played battle royale game in the world.
 Fortnite Battle Royale (Epic Games, 2017) - Contributed to increasing the popularity of the battle royale genre (inspired by PUBG), as well as leading a transition for some free-to-play games away from loot boxes to battle passes. Fortnite quickly exploded into the public consciousness and became prevalent throughout popular culture.
 Hollow Knight (Team Cherry, 2017) and Ori and the Blind Forest (Moon Studios, 2015) for greatly contributing to the popularity of the Metroidvania indie game renaissance.

In popular culture 

 In the 1989 film Back to the Future Part II, protagonist Marty McFly is sent into his future 2015, enters a 1980s-themed bar and encounters two children trying to figure out how to operate an old arcade game, Wild Gunman. When Marty gets the arcade game working, the kids react negatively describing a game that requires a player to use their hands as a "baby game."
 Tron: Legacy is released in 2010, and is a sequel to the 1982 film Tron, a film that takes place within the digital world of a video game.
 The 2012 film, Wreck-It Ralph centers on a video game villain who wishes to be a hero. Many references and cameos to other video games are present throughout the film.
 Frank Underwood, the protagonist in the Netflix political drama House of Cards (2013–2018) is an avid video gamer, and is often seen playing games like Call of Duty and mobile games in his spare time.
 Two films in the Jumanji franchise, Welcome to the Jungle (2017) and its sequel The Next Level (2019), were inspired by classic video games of the 1990s.

Hardware timeline 
The following gallery highlights hardware used to predominantly play games throughout the 2010s.

Notes

References

Further reading 

 
 

 
 
video games
Video games by decade
2010s decade overviews